Natalia Mikhailovna Schneiderman (May 22, 1956 – July 2, 2008), known as Natasha Shneider, was a Latvian-born Russian-American musician and actress. She was most notably the keyboardist and vocalist in the band Eleven, along with her partner, bandmate Alain Johannes. Shneider contributed to tracks for Chris Cornell and Queens of the Stone Age, and together with Johannes toured with Cornell on his Euphoria Morning tour in 1999 and with Queens in 2005 on their Lullabies to Paralyze tour. She died of cancer in 2008.

Life and career
Natalia Mikhailovna Schneiderman was born in Riga, Latvia (at the time a member state of the Soviet Union), to a Jewish family.  She proved musically gifted from an early age and both of her parents were musicians.

In the early 1970s, Shneider was a member of 'Sovremennik', a state-run pop orchestra, that featured her on vocals and piano, as well as her first husband Serge Kapustin (born 1949) on guitar and percussion. Her brother Vladimir Shneider (1951 - 2012) produced and played piano and keyboards for the 'Singing Hearts', which was one of Russia's hottest groups in the mid-1970s, whose output and sound were heavily controlled by the Soviet authorities. Vladimir Shneider recalled: "We'd sing 37 songs about how good the Communist Party is, and at the end—if we were lucky — we were allowed to play a mellow song like Killing Me Softly or Ain't No Sunshine. But never rock."

In May 1976, the Schneiderman siblings and Kapustin defected to the West, arriving in New York City without finances or connections. Natasha and Kapustin's son Robin was born just two months after arriving. They took day jobs and played evening gigs around the city - Vladimir Schneiderman also changed his surname to Shneider, with Natasha changing her married surname from Kapustina to Kapustin. In 1978 they arrived in Hollywood where they met Guy Costa, the head of Motown's Studio Operations, who introduced them to Berry Gordy, founder of Motown Records. As a consequence of the meeting with Gordy they were signed to the label, reputedly the first Russian band to be on a major label. In June 1980 their newly named group, Black Russian, released an album of R&B styled pop that was well received by Billboard who highlighted the songs  Mystified, Leave Me Now (which was later released as a single), Emptiness, New York City, and Love's Enough. The album was not a commercial success and Black Russian did not continue. Natasha Shneider and Serge Kapustin then divorced.
 
In 1987, Shneider married her second husband Alain Johannes and they released the album Walk the Moon under the MCA label.  In 1990 they formed the band Eleven with drummer Jack Irons and released their debut album Awake in a Dream the following year.   The group would go on to release four more albums over the next twenty years, with Irons leaving during their third album (Thunk) in 1995 to play with Pearl Jam, and coming back for the fifth album (Howling Book) in 2003.

Shneider and Johannes participated with Josh Homme and other artists on The Desert Sessions, Volumes 7 & 8.  They also contributed to the 2002 Queens of the Stone Age album Songs for the Deaf, and joined the band as part of their touring line-up in support of their 2005 album, Lullabies to Paralyze (Alain Johannes also contributed on several Lullabies''' tracks).

They wrote, performed and produced with Chris Cornell for his 1999 solo album, Euphoria Morning, and formed part of his band for the subsequent tour. The song "Someone to Die For" that Shneider wrote alongside Cornell and Johannes, was part of the soundtrack of Spider-Man 2 (2004), performed by Jimmy Gnecco of Ours and Brian May of Queen. A demo version of the song performed by Cornell and Eleven is available on the internet.

Acting career
Shneider acted in two feature films, playing the roles of Soviet cosmonaut Irina Yakunina in the 1984 film 2010, and as Polish former exchange student Wanda Yakubovska in the film Spiker (1986). She also had roles in the TV shows Miami Vice and Hill Street Blues. Shneider wrote and performed the song "Who's in Control", for the 2004 film Catwoman, and contributed harpsichord to the 2008 Louis XIV track "Guilt By Association".

Death
On July 2, 2008, Shneider died from cancer. The news broke with a message posted on the MySpace page of the band Sweethead, of which Shneider's close friend and former band-mate Troy Van Leeuwen is a member:

The following message later replaced the main page at qotsa.com:

Shneider is buried at the Hollywood Forever Cemetery in Los Angeles.

 Legacy 
On August 16, 2008, Queens of the Stone Age performed a concert in celebration of Shneider's life at the Henry Fonda Theatre in Los Angeles. They were joined on stage by Alain Johannes, Tenacious D's Jack Black and Kyle Gass, Matt Cameron, Brody Dalle, Jesse Hughes, Chris Goss and PJ Harvey, playing a variety of QOTSA and non-QOTSA songs. Proceeds from the concert went to defray the costs associated with Shneider's illness.

In late 2009, a song she co-wrote with Johannes, "Time for Miracles", was recorded by Adam Lambert and used in the movie 2012. In 2010 the track WYUT, co-written by Shneider, Johannes and Natalie Imbruglia, appeared on Imbruglia's album Come to Life.

While on his solo tour between 2011 and 2016, Chris Cornell would often pay tribute to her and play the song "When I'm Down", (from the album Euphoria Morning'' that Shneider produced) accompanied by a vinyl recording of the original piano track that Shneider performed for the song.

References

External links
Shneider performing with Queens of the Stone Age at Belfort, 2005

1956 births
2008 deaths
Women rock singers
Musicians from Moscow
Queens of the Stone Age members
Motown artists
Russian keyboardists
Burials at Hollywood Forever Cemetery
Latvian Jews
Deaths from cancer in California
Soviet emigrants to the United States
American people of Latvian-Jewish descent
Jewish American musicians
20th-century American musicians
Soviet women singers
Jewish rock musicians
20th-century American women singers
20th-century American singers
21st-century American women singers
21st-century American singers
Eleven (band) members